Mrs. Fisher's, Inc., also known as Mrs. Fishers Potato Chips, is a regional manufacturer of potato chips founded in Rockford, Illinois. The company was begun in 1932 by Ethel Fisher and today is one of the oldest chip manufacturers in the Midwest and is recognized brand name of potato chips in parts of the Midwestern United States.

History
According to the Mrs. Fisher's website, it was Eugene Fisher, Ethel (Feldt) Fisher's husband, who had the idea of producing potato chips. Eugene and Ethel cooked chips to earn extra money during The Depression.  The logo for Mrs. Fisher's potato chips, invented by Eugene in the first year of business, has changed little over the years.  The logo features a 'potato-man' wearing a top hat dancing in a circle with two children.  Packaging for Mrs. Fisher's also features bright red and yellow striping along the edges.  Originally, the brand carried the name "Mr. and Mrs. Fisher's"; but when Eugene Fisher later deserted his wife and daughter and the business, Ethel Fisher removed his name from the branding.

The company, which still operates out of Rockford, was eventually sold by Ethel Fisher to truck driver Sylvester Hahn in 1949.  Employee Anthony Marsili, and his brother Mario, purchased the business in 1962. Later, and for 29 years, the company was owned by Chuck, Pete and Paul DiVenti. The company is currently owned by Roma and Mark Hailman, former employees who bought the company in 2007. Since its inception Mrs. Fisher's has remained a locally run company. Mrs. Fisher's chips are sold in northern Illinois and southern Wisconsin.

Products
Currently Mrs. Fisher's produces several types of potato chips: regular, rippled, BBQ, BBQ rippled, French Onion, and dark chips. The dark chips are made from a different potato. Mrs. Fisher's chips, which in total is sold at the rate of about 600,000 pounds per year. The company also produces caramel corn, nuts and other items under separate label.

FDA regulation 
In 2017, Mrs. Fisher's was forced to make big changes in its traditional recipe when the U.S. Food and Drug Administration (FDA) issued a ban on partially hydrogenated oils. Since the ruling, Mrs. Fisher’s has been adjusting their chip recipe and customers have noticed a difference. The company states that it has been the third time in the company’s history that an FDA regulation has caused the company to change their recipe.

See also
Rockford, Illinois
Potato chip

References

External links
 Official website

Companies based in Rockford, Illinois
Food manufacturers of the United States
Snack food manufacturers of the United States
Food and drink companies established in 1932
Brand name potato chips and crisps
1932 establishments in Illinois